Tomás de Torquemada  (14 October 1420 – 16 September 1498), also anglicized as Thomas of Torquemada, was a Castilian Dominican friar and first Grand Inquisitor of the Tribunal of the Holy Office (otherwise known as the Spanish Inquisition).  The Spanish Inquisition was a group of ecclesiastical prelates that was created in 1478, and which was charged with the somewhat ill-defined task of "upholding Catholic religious orthodoxy" within the lands of the newly formed union of the crowns of Castile and Aragon.  The lands of this newly formed royal union are now known as the Kingdom of Spain.

Mainly because of persecution, Muslims and Jews in Castile and Aragon at that time found it socially, politically, and economically expedient to convert to Catholicism (see Converso, Morisco, and Marrano). The existence of superficial converts from Judaism (i.e., Crypto-Jews) was perceived by the Catholic Monarchs as a threat to the religious and social life in their realms. This led Torquemada, who himself was believed to have had converso ancestors, to be one of the chief supporters of the Alhambra Decree that expelled the Jews from the Crowns of Castile and Aragon in 1492.

Owing to the perception of widespread use of torture to extract confessions, and advocacy of burning at the stake those deemed guilty, Torquemada's name has become synonymous with cruelty, religious intolerance, and fanaticism. Although torture was included in inquisition manuals from 1252 onward, it is largely absent from trial records, suggesting that while torture was allowed, it was rarely used.

The number of burnings at the stake during Torquemada’s tenure has been estimated at about 2,000.

Biography

Early life

Torquemada entered the local San Pablo Dominican monastery at a very young age. As a zealous advocate of church orthodoxy, he earned a solid reputation for learning, piety, and austerity. As a result, he was promoted to Prior of the monastery of Santa Cruz at Segovia. Around this time, he met the young Princess Isabella I, and the two immediately established religious and ideological rapport. For a number of years, Torquemada served as her regular confessor and personal advisor. He was present at Isabella's coronation in 1474, remained her closest ally and supporter, and even advised her to marry King Ferdinand of Aragon in 1469 to consolidate their kingdoms and form a power base he could draw on for his own purposes. Torquemada subdued Ferdinand's own ambitions and became his confessor also.

Establishment of the Holy Office of the Inquisition
Torquemada deeply feared the Marrano and Morisco as a menace to Spain's welfare by both their increasing religious influence and their economic domination of Spain. The Crown of Aragon had Dominican inquisitors almost continuously throughout much of the 14th and the 15th centuries. King Ferdinand and Queen Isabella petitioned Pope Sixtus IV to grant their request for a Holy Office to administer an inquisition in Spain. The Pope granted their request and established the Holy Office for the Propagation of the Faith in late 1478.

The papal bull gave the sovereigns full powers to name inquisitors. Rome retained the right to formally appoint the royal nominees. Henry Charles Lea observed that the Spanish Inquisition in both Castile and Aragon remained firmly under Ferdinand's direction throughout the joint reign.

Grand Inquisitor
The Pope went on to appoint a number of inquisitors for the Spanish Kingdoms in early 1482, including Torquemada. A year later he was named Grand Inquisitor of Spain, which he remained until his death in 1498. In 1484, Torquemada relinquished his role as royal confessor to Diego Deza, a Dominican who would eventually succeed him as Grand Inquisitor. The following year, at a general assembly in Seville, Torquemada promulgated the twenty-eight articles of faith that would be used to guide the inquisitors' investigations.

In the fifteen years under his direction, the Spanish Inquisition grew from a single tribunal at Seville to a network of two dozen Holy Offices. As Grand Inquisitor, Torquemada reorganized the Spanish Inquisition (originally based in Castile in 1478), establishing tribunals in Sevilla, Jaén, Córdoba, Ciudad Real and (later) Saragossa. His quest was to rid Spain of all heresy. The Spanish chronicler Sebastián de Olmedo called him "the hammer of heretics, the light of Spain, the savior of his country, the honor of his order."

The Treaty of Granada (1491), as negotiated at the final surrender of the Muslim state of Al-Andalus, clearly mandated protection of religious rights, but this was reversed just over 3 months later by the Alhambra Decree of March 31, 1492. Under the new decree, approximately 40,000 Jews were expelled from Spain with only their personal possessions. Approximately 50,000 other Jews received Christian baptism to remain in Spain. Many of them, derogatorily dubbed "Marranos" by the Old Christian majority, secretly kept some of their Jewish traditions. They were among the chief targets of the Inquisition, but it also pursued anyone who criticized it.

So many clemency petitions were sent to Rome that the Pope became aware of Torquemada's severity, and three times he had called the Inquisition's representatives to Rome. In addition, Isabella and Ferdinand were concerned that so much money was being diverted to the Holy Office that they too protested to the Pope. But Torquemada's power kept him in his position until at least 1494.

There are various estimates of the number of victims of the Spanish Inquisition during Torquemada's reign as Grand Inquisitor. Hernando del Pulgar, Queen Isabella's secretary, wrote that 2,000 executions took place throughout the entirety of her reign, which extended well beyond Torquemada's death.

Death
During his final years, Torquemada's failing health 'ostensibly' caused Pope Alexander VI to appoint four assistant inquisitors in June 1494 to assist Torquemada with the administration of the Inquisition. While officially, this papal appointment of assistants appeared to be due to Torquemada's 'failing health,' many historians believe that the numerous complaints reaching the Pope about Torquemada's excessive zeal and cruelty may have been the true cause for this papal appointment of 'assistant inquisitors.'  With his faith in his mission undiminished, Torquemada retired to the monastery of St. Thomas Aquinas in Ávila in 1494, typically leaving his cell only to attend to the royal family, and again living the more simple life of a monk.  In 1498, while still holding the office of the Grand Inquisitor, he held his last general assembly, where new rules were formulated to assure the continuation of the Inquisition in Spain.  These rules attempted to curb some of the administrative abuses for which complaints had been lodged against the Inquisition. After fifteen years as Spain's Grand Inquisitor, Torquemada died in the monastery on 16 September 1498 and was interred there. His tomb was robbed in 1832, only two years before the Inquisition was finally disbanded. His bones were allegedly stolen and ritually incinerated in the same manner as an auto-da-fé.

Notes

See also
History_of_the_World,_Part_I#The_Spanish_Inquisition

References

Footnotes

Bibliography
Caldwell Ames, Christine, Righteous Persecution: Inquisition, Dominicans, and Christianity in the Middle Ages, (Philadelphia: University of Pennsylvania Press, 2013) 
Duran, Alphonsus Maria, Why Apologies for the Spanish Inquisition?, (Eric Gladkowski, Ed., 2000). .
Goldberg, Enid A. & Itzkowitz, Norman, "Tomas de Torquemada" (A Wicked History), (Scholastic Books, 2008) 
Kamen, Henry, The Spanish Inquisition: A Historical Revision, (Yale University Press, 1999). .
Lea, Henry Charles, The history of the Inquisition of Spain, (Macmillan, 1906–07) Wikisource: A History of the Inquisition of the Middle Ages/Volume I
Sabatini, Rafael, Torquemada and the Spanish Inquisition (revised edition, Houghton Mifflin Company, 1930)

Walsh, William Thomas, Characters of the Inquisition, (Tan Books and Publishers, 1987).  .

1420 births
1498 deaths
People from Valladolid
Grand Inquisitors of Spain
Spanish Dominicans
Genocide perpetrators
15th-century Castilian Roman Catholic priests
Spanish people of Jewish descent
University of Salamanca alumni
Persecution of Muslims by Christians
Islamophobia in Europe
Antisemitism in Spain
Spanish Inquisition
Anti-Islam sentiment in Spain
Conversos